James Burd (March 10, 1725 – October 5, 1793) was a colonial American soldier in the French and Indian War, during which he played an important role in fortifying the Pennsylvania frontier.

Early life
Born in Ormiston, near Edinburgh, Scotland, the son of Edward Burd, James Burd came to Philadelphia, Pennsylvania in 1747 or 1748 where he worked as a merchant. On May 14, 1748, he married Sarah Shippen, daughter of former mayor Edward Shippen of the prominent Shippen family of Philadelphia. The couple had eleven children, eight of whom lived to maturity, including Edward Burd.

In 1752, he moved his young family to manage his father-in-law's vast land holdings in the area now known as
Shippensburg.

Seven Years' War

In 1756, he settled on a farm in Lancaster County, Pennsylvania, but soon joined the military as an officer at the outbreak of the French and Indian War. He was commissioned a major at Fort Augusta (at present-day Sunbury, Pennsylvania) in 1756, and on December 8, 1756, after the resignation of Lt. Col. William Clapham, he took command of the fort. Under his command the fort's construction was completed, as well as the Provincial Road between the fort and Tulpehocken, the location of Conrad Weiser's homestead (near present-day Reading).

In 1758, Burd was promoted to colonel. He went with General John Forbes on the Duquesne Expedition under Colonel Henry Bouquet, and 360 of the 400-man garrison participated in the expedition, leaving 40 men at Fort Augusta. During that campaign, Burd contributed to the construction of Fort Ligonier. After the fall of Fort Duquesne, Burd was sent to the Erie area, where he supervised the construction of roads and fortifications.

Most importantly, upon his return from the Great Lakes region he oversaw the erection, with Joseph Shippen, of Fort Burd (later confusedly called Redstone Old Fort due to its proximity to the Monongahela River tributary Redstone Creek). The confusion comes from its being mistaken for a fort associated with the name "Hangard" which French and Native American forces burned repeatedly. Burd felt ill-advised to repeat the blunder, and directed his engineer, instead, to erect the bastion fort on a high bluff overlooking both the Monongahela River and Dunlap's Creek.  From this site, at the Western terminus of Nemacolin Trail would develop Brownsville, Pennsylvania, and this former trading Post would grow to serve as a historic depot for river transport to Fort Pitt during the war and as the settlement expanded came to build many of the keel boats and later, steam boats that transported settlers to the Northwest Territory, Ohio Country and via the Missouri Valley, the far west and the Oregon Country. He returned to Fort Augusta in 1760, where he remained until the dissolution of the Pennsylvania Regiment.

From 1764 to 1770 he held the office of Justice of Lancaster County.

In 1774, a year before the outbreak of hostilities with Great Britain, Burd was instrumental in garnering local support for the colonial congress in its opposition to the Crown, and by the following year he was assisting in the military organization of Lancaster County as a member of the Committee of Safety. His direct military involvement in the Revolutionary War was brief, however, as he resigned his post in December 1776 because of a dispute concerning rank and insubordination in his command and some criticism from the Committee of Safety. He retired to civilian life, as a county judge.

He died at "Tinian", his farm near Highspire, Dauphin County, Pennsylvania, on October 5, 1793. He and his wife (d. September 17, 1784) are buried near the entrance in the Old Presbyterian Cemetery in Middletown, Pennsylvania.

References 
Cubbison, Douglas. The British Defeat of the French in Pennsylvania 1758: A Military History of the Forbes Campaign Against Fort Duquesne. Jefferson, NC: McFarland & Co., 201.
Nixon, Lily Lee. James Burd: Frontier Defender, 1726-1793. University of Pennsylvania Press, 1941.

External links
Portrait and biography at the Augusta Regiment webpage
James Burd Biography, based on John W. Jordan, Genealogical and Personal History of Fayette County, Pennsylvania (New York, 1912), Fayette County, Pennsylvania Genealogical Site
James Burd Pennsylvania Historical Marker
Burd-Shippen Papers, 1708-1792, American Philosophical Society Library, Philadelphia
Burd-Shippen Family Collection, 1704-1900, at the Pennsylvania State Archives, Harrisburg, PA
Burd Family Papers at the University of Delaware Morris Library, Newark, Delaware
James Burd papers at the Historical Society of Dauphin County, Pennsylvania
Burd-Shippen Papers 1738-1847, at the William L. Clements Library, University of Michigan

1726 births
1793 deaths
People from Ormiston
People of colonial Pennsylvania
Scottish emigrants to the Thirteen Colonies
People from Harrisburg, Pennsylvania
People from Shippensburg, Pennsylvania
People of Pennsylvania in the French and Indian War
People of Pennsylvania in the American Revolution
Colonial American merchants
Burials in Pennsylvania